
Gmina Mirów is a rural gmina (administrative district) in Szydłowiec County, Masovian Voivodeship, in east-central Poland. Its seat is the village of Mirów, which lies approximately 13 kilometres (8 mi) south-east of Szydłowiec and 115 km (71 mi) south of Warsaw.

Villages
Gmina Mirów contains the villages and settlements of Bieszków Dolny, Bieszków Górny, Mirów, Mirów Nowy, Mirów Stary, Mirówek, Rogów, Zbijów Duży and Zbijów Mały.

Neighbouring gminas
Gmina Mirów is bordered by the gminas of Jastrząb, Mirzec, Skarżysko Kościelne, Szydłowiec and Wierzbica.

References
Polish official population figures 2006

Mirow
Szydłowiec County